The 1985 Individual Long Track World Championship was the 15th edition of the FIM speedway Individual Long Track World Championship. The event was held on 15 September 1985 at the Korskro Motor Centre in Esbjerg in Denmark.

The world title was won by Simon Wigg of England.

Final Classification 

 E = eliminated (no further ride)
 f = fell
 ef = engine failure
 x = excluded

References 

1985
Speedway competitions in Denmark
Motor
Motor